Sir St John Brodrick, of Midleton (3 December 1627 – January 1711) was an Irish Member of Parliament.

He represented County Cork in the Irish House of Commons from 1692 to 1693 and from 1695 to 1699.

He was the son of Sir Thomas Brodrick, of Wandsworth, by his wife Katherine, daughter of Robert Nicholas, of Manningford Bruce. Through her mother Katherine was granddaughter of Nicholas St John, of Lydiard Tregoze, and first cousin of Sir John St John, 1st Baronet.

By his wife Alice Clayton he was father of (among others):
 Thomas Brodrick (1654–1730)
 Alan Brodrick, 1st Viscount Midleton (c.1656–1728)
 St John Brodrick (1659–1707)

References
 

1627 births
1711 deaths
Politicians from County Cork
Irish MPs 1692–1693
Irish MPs 1695–1699
18th-century Irish people
Members of the Parliament of Ireland (pre-1801) for County Cork constituencies